Fan Weixiang (born 26 June 1997) is a Chinese footballer currently playing as a goalkeeper for Jiangxi Beidamen.

Career statistics

Club
.

Notes

References

1997 births
Living people
Chinese footballers
Association football goalkeepers
China League Two players
Chinese Super League players
Shenyang Dongjin F.C. players
Chongqing Liangjiang Athletic F.C. players
21st-century Chinese people